This was the first edition of the tournament.

Wang Xinyu and Zheng Saisai won the title, defeating Eri Hozumi and Zhang Shuai in the final, 6–4, 3–6, [10–5].

Seeds

Draw

Draw

References

External links
Main draw

Courmayeur Ladies Open - Doubles